The Bidjara or Pitjara are an Aboriginal Australian people of eastern Queensland. They are to be distinguished from the Bidjara of southwestern Queensland and the Badjiri of southern Queensland.

Country
Their territorial extensions ran north of Augathella, to Mantuan Downs. Their eastern limits were around Killarney and Chesterton. To the south, they were present as far as Caroline, while their western borders were on the Nive River.

History
Tindale entertained the possibility that the Pitjara and Badjiri split up, before the advent of white settlement, as a result of an easterly thrust by other tribes which caused them to develop as independent tribal realities.

Alternative names
 Bidjera.
 Peechera.

Notes

Citations

Sources

Aboriginal peoples of Queensland